The 2009–10 Football League Championship was Doncaster Rovers F.C.'s second season in the Championship. This article shows statistics of the club's players in the season, and also lists all matches that the club has played during the 2009–10 season.

Match results

Legend

Football League Championship

League Cup

FA Cup

Squad statistics
Appearances for competitive matches only

External links
 Doncaster Rovers official website
 Doncaster Rovers 2009–10 season players stats at Soccerbase

2009–10
2009–10 Football League Championship by team